is a Japanese former professional racing cyclist, who helped to pioneer professional cycling in Japan. Following the lead of Masatoshi Ichikawa, he rode professionally in Europe for the Italian Team Polti and in 1995 became the second Japanese to compete in the Giro d'Italia (after Ichikawa). In 1996, he became the second Japanese to start the Tour de France (after Kisso Kawamuro). On both occasions, he had to retire before finishing the race. His major victories include three wins in the Tour de Hokkaido. He is now a frequent commentator on broadcasts of cycling races in Japan and also serves as technical adviser for Team Ukyo.

Major results

1990
 1st Overall Tour de Hokkaido
1991
 1st Overall Tour de Hokkaido
1993
 1st Overall Tour de Hokkaido
1994
 9th Japan Cup Cycle Road Race
1996
 2nd Tour de Okinawa
 3rd Overall Tour of Japan
1997
 4th Japan Cup Cycle Road Race

References

External links

1963 births
Living people
Japanese male cyclists
Sportspeople from Hiroshima
Japanese sports announcers
Asian Games medalists in cycling
Cyclists at the 1990 Asian Games
Medalists at the 1990 Asian Games
Asian Games bronze medalists for Japan